Kristijan Tucaković (Serbian Cyrillic: Кристијан Туцаковић; born November 20, 1975) is a retired  Serbian footballer.

External sources
 Profile at Srbijafudbal
 Profile and stats until 2003 at Dekisa.tripod

Living people
1975 births
Sportspeople from Saarbrücken
Serbian footballers
FK Javor Ivanjica players
FK Sloga Kraljevo players
FK Radnički Niš players
FK Radnički 1923 players
FK Sutjeska Nikšić players
FK Zemun players
FK Srem players
FK Bežanija players
FK Inđija players
OFK Mladenovac players
FK Kolubara players
Serbian SuperLiga players
Association football defenders
Footballers from Saarland